Gonzalagunia pauciflora is a species of plant in the family Rubiaceae. It is endemic to Ecuador.
The specific epithet pauciflora is Latin for 'few-flowered'.

References

Sources
 

pau
Endemic flora of Ecuador
Vulnerable flora of South America
Taxonomy articles created by Polbot